Bhadar is a village and community development block headquarters in Amethi tehsil of Amethi district, Uttar Pradesh, India. As of 2011, it has a population of 2,896 people, in 465 households. It has one primary school and a veterinary hospital and it hosts a weekly haat but not a permanent market. It serves as the headquarters of a nyaya panchayat that also includes 13 other villages.

The 1951 census recorded Bhadar as comprising 2 hamlets, with a total population of 1,411 people (712 male and 699 female), in 288 households and 269 physical houses. The area of the village was given as 398 acres. 136 residents were literate, all male. The village was listed as belonging to the pargana of Asal and the thana of Piparpur. The village had a district board-run primary school with 150 students in attendance as of 1 January 1951.

The 1961 census recorded Bhadar as comprising 2 hamlets, with a total population of 1,583 people (787 male and 796 female), in 318 households and 288 physical houses. The area of the village was given as 398 acres and it had a post office and maternity and child welfare centre at that point.

The 1981 census recorded Bhadar as having a population of 2,156 people, in 401 households, and having an area of 153.79 hectares. The main staple foods were listed as wheat and rice.

The 1991 census recorded Bhadar as having a total population of 2,418 people (1,209 male and 1,209 female), in 407 households and 395 physical houses. The area of the village was listed as 154.00 hectares. Members of the 0-6 age group numbered 429, or 18% of the total; this group was 53% male (227) and 47% female (202). Members of scheduled castes numbered 475, or 20% of the village's total population, while no members of scheduled tribes were recorded. The literacy rate of the village was 54% (662 men and 414 women, counting only people age 7 and up). 664 people were classified as main workers (513 men and 151 women), while 101 people were classified as marginal workers (1 man and 100 women); the remaining 1,653 residents were non-workers. The breakdown of main workers by employment category was as follows: 295 cultivators (i.e. people who owned or leased their own land); 183 agricultural labourers (i.e. people who worked someone else's land in return for payment); 30 workers in livestock, forestry, fishing, hunting, plantations, orchards, etc.; 0 in mining and quarrying; 23 household industry workers; 33 workers employed in other manufacturing, processing, service, and repair roles; 0 construction workers; 18 employed in trade and commerce; 1 employed in transport, storage, and communications; and 81 in other services.

Villages
Bhadar CD block has the following 84 villages:

References

Villages in Amethi district
Community development blocks in India